The Manu short-tailed bat (Carollia manu) is a bat species found in Peru and Bolivia.

References

External links 
 IABIN Database Entry

Bats of South America
Mammals of Peru
Mammals of Bolivia
Carollia
Mammals described in 2004